Columbia Gorge Community College is a public community college in The Dalles, Oregon, which is situated and surrounded by the Columbia Gorge National Scenic Area.

History
The college began in 1977 as the Wasco Area Education Service District, which not long after was changed to Treaty Oak Education Service District. The original incarnation of the college operated in leased facilities in downtown The Dalles for 16 years.

In 1989, a public vote changed the college's designation from a service district to a community college, and later its name was changed to Columbia Gorge Community College. In 1993, a bond election allowed for the purchase and remodeling of the current campus facility, a former hospital.

In 2001, voters in Wasco County and Hood River County approved the annexation of Hood River County to the college's service district. The Hood River Center operated out of rented facilities near the waterfront in Hood River County. The college started the first wind technician training of any West Coast community college in 2006–07. This new program, established through the vision of Instructional VP Dr. Susan Wolff, was called Renewable Energy Technology. It was later transformed into Electro-Mechanical Technology, which continues today while retaining renewable energy as part of the curriculum.

In 2008, the college completed construction of its new campus in Hood River and a new Health Sciences Building on its campus in The Dalles.

In 2013, the college became independently accredited.

The college's founding president was Dr. William Bell, who led efforts to relocate the college to its new campus in 1994. The second president was Dr. Frank Toda, who led the 2001 annexation effort with board chair Mike Schend, as well as such initiatives as the new nursing program in 2001, a 2004 bond measure for the Hood River campus and The Dalles Campus improvements, Fort Dalles Readiness Center construction, and independent accreditation. In 2018, Dr. Marta Yera-Cronin became president of the college. Cronin was formerly vice president of academic affairs at Indian River State College in Fort Pierce, Florida.

The college announced in 2018 that it would be building a new skill center and student housing, which opened in fall term of 2021.  These projects were funded by the Oregon Legislature, City of The Dalles, Wasco County and the college itself (through a full faith and credit bond measure) without need for a local bond measure. The college added new programs including Construction Technology, Pre-Construction, and Advanced Manufacturing & Fabrication in September 2021. Aviation maintenance technician training is anticipated early in 2022. The college also plans other new programs including Agriculture, Fire Science and Cyber security in the near future.

Campus
The Dalles Campus is located at 400 East Scenic Drive, next to Sorosis Park, overlooking the town. The Campus consists of six main buildings and smaller buildings surrounding an outdoor amphitheater. CGCC is the closest community college to the Portland Metro area with on-campus student housing.

The Hood River Indian Creek Campus is located at 1730 College Way, next to Indian Creek in Hood River, with scenic views of Mt. Hood and Mt. Adams.

Accreditation
The college is accredited by the Northwest Commission on Colleges and Universities. Prior to being independently accredited, it was accredited through a contract with Portland Community College.

Athletics 
As of 2022, CGCC does not have any athletic teams. However, the college is approved by the NWAC athletic conference to participate in JR college athletics.

See also 
 List of Oregon community colleges

References

External links
Official website

Columbia River Gorge
Education in Wasco County, Oregon
Buildings and structures in The Dalles, Oregon
Community colleges in Oregon
Educational institutions established in 1977
Universities and colleges accredited by the Northwest Commission on Colleges and Universities
1977 establishments in Oregon